Jesuit drama was a form of theatre practised in the colleges of the Society of Jesus between the 16th and 18th centuries, as a way of instructing students in rhetoric, assimilating Christian values and imparting Catholic doctrine.

History
In the late 16th and early 17th centuries, Jesuit colleges spread across Europe, and almost all of these presented at least one play each year. The first recorded performance was in 1551, at the College Mamertino at Messina, in Sicily, but by the mid-17th centuries, several hundred plays were being performed annually. The 'Ratio studiorum' of 1599 made it mandatory for Jesuit schools to exercise their students in rhetorical self-expression through dramas, debates, and other declamation of poetry.

As Jesuit drama expanded, it also evolved, becoming more elaborate. The earliest plays were performed in Latin, without any female characters or costumes. Later, performances were frequently given in the vernacular, and they became important social events in the towns where the colleges were established. By public requests the dramatic representations had often to be staged a second or third time.

As Jesuit drama became more extravagant, these productions were increasingly criticised. These criticisms focused on the cost of the plays and their exaggerated place in the curriculum of certain Jesuit colleges. These criticisms added to the already growing anti-Jesuit sentiment in the 18th century, which resulted in the banning of Jesuit drama in many areas. Performances ceased in 1773, with the suppression of the Society of Jesus, but were revived, after the restoration of the Society in 1814.

Content
Jesuit dramas, as well as instructing students in correct language use and oratory skills, served as a means of instruction in Roman Catholic doctrine and values, for both the students and the audience. The plays were therefore based on accounts from the Bible, or saintly legends.

Most pieces of Jesuit drama contained music of some form. These musical elements were particularly elaborate in Austria and southern Germany, as well as in France where ballet was often included in Jesuit productions.

Examples
 Ambrosia by Edmund Campion
 Histoire tragique de la pucelle de Domrémy by Fronton du Duc
 Sigeris, Tragœdia by Bandino Gualfreducci
 Cenodoxus by Jacob Bidermann
 Hippolito, Edipo and Ermenegildo by Emanuele Tesauro
 Zeno by Joseph Simons
 Sarcotis by Jacob Masen
 Ermenegildo martire by Francesco Sforza Pallavicino
 Pietas victrix by Nicola Avancini

References

 John Gassner and Edward Quinn (eds.), The Reader's Encyclopedia of World Drama (2002)
 

Christian literature
Jesuit education
New Latin literature